Yinhai District (Cantonese: Ngan Hoi) is a district of the city of Beihai, Guangxi, People's Republic of China. It has 7 neighbourhood committees and 39 village committees under the administration of five towns.
 Area: 
 Population: 130,000
 District seat: at Mingzhu Avenue

Subdivisions
Five towns
 Gaode (高德)
 Xitang (西塘)
 Xiantian (咸田)
 Qiaogang (侨港)
 Fucheng (福成)

External links

 Official site (in Simplified Chinese)
 Map

County-level divisions of Guangxi
Beihai